Two A.M.; or, the Husband's Return is an 1896 British short  silent comedy film, produced by Robert W. Paul, featuring a drunken husband returning home late at night to the irritation of his wife. The film which, "was almost certainly sourced from a concurrent stage production," is according to Michael Brooke of BFI Screenonline, "a study in often quite risqué body language, with the husband clearly the worse for drink, and the wife determined both to remonstrate with him and to get him undressed and into bed as quickly as possible."

References

External links
 
 

British black-and-white films
British silent short films
1896 comedy films
1896 films
British comedy short films
1896 short films
1890s British films
Silent comedy films
Films about marriage
Films about alcohol